Giddy is a compilation album by Irish band Pugwash, featuring tracks from their four previous studio albums. It was released by Ape Records on 29 September 2009.

Track listing

Personnel 

 Thomas Walsh: vocals, backing vocals, organ, acoustic guitar, guitar, percussion, piano, glockenspiel, electric guitar, saxophone, tambourine, brass, sampling, Mellotron, vibes, Chamberlin, shakers, Fender Rhodes, sleigh bells, Wurlitzer, Casio, wobble board, baritone guitar
 Keith Farrell: synthesizer, acoustic guitar, bass guitar, guitar, electric guitar, vocals, backing vocals, brass, Chamberlin, Fender Rhodes, upright bass, fuzz bass, Casio, twelve-string guitar
 Johnny Boyle: percussion, cymbal, drums, drum loop
 Jason Falkner: Vox Continental
 Dave Gregory: piano
 Gerald Eaton: Hammond organ
 Neil Hannon: piano, glockenspiel, vocals, backing vocals, zither, Fender Rhodes
 Graham Hopkins: drums
 Nelson Bragg: percussion, scratching, castanets, conga, shaker, güiro
 Daragh Bohan: guitar
 Stephen Farrell: electric guitar
 Tosh Flood: banjo, backing vocals
 Duncan Maitland: synthesizer, guitar, percussion, piano, harpsichord, vocals, backing vocals, brass, sampling, Mellotron, vibes, Fender Rhodes, Wurlitzer, tack piano, twelve-string acoustic guitar
 Aidan O'Grady:  drums
 The Section Quartet: strings

References 

2009 compilation albums
Pugwash (band) albums